Encelia farinosa (commonly known as brittlebush, brittlebrush, or incienso), is a common desert shrub of the southwestern United States and northern Mexico. It has a variety of historical uses.

Description

Each has 8–18 orange-yellow ray florets,  in length, and yellow or purple-brown disc florets. The fruit measures  and no pappus is visible. During dry seasons the plant goes drought deciduous, shedding all of its foliage, relying on the water stored in its thick stems.

Encelia californica is similar, but has only one flower head per stalk.

Chemistry 
The leaves contain 3-Acetyl-6-methoxybenzaldehyde.

Taxonomy

Varieties 
Two varieties of E. farinosa are recognized by Flora of North America.
Encelia farinosa var. farinosa – yellow disc florets
Encelia farinosa var. phenicodonta (Blake) I.M.Johnston – purple-brown disc florets

Varieties formerly included E. f. var. radians, now regarded as a separate species E. radians Brandegee.

Etymology 
The common name "brittlebush" comes from the brittleness of its stems. Other names include hierba del vaso (Spanish) and cotx (Seri). Another Spanish name for it is incienso because the dried sap was burned by early Spanish missions in the New World as incense.

Distribution and habitat 

Encelia farinosa is common in the southwestern United States (California, Arizona, Utah, and Nevada) and northern Mexico (Baja California, Baja California Sur, Sonora, Sinaloa, and Hidalgo).

It requires a very sunny position in a deep very well-drained soil, and minimal winter frost.

It does well in cultivation often being used for border, erosion control, ground cover and massing. Recently the plant has spread dramatically in areas not natural to its distribution in large part because Caltrans has begun to use it in hydroseeding.

Uses 
Brittlebush has a long history of uses by indigenous and pioneer peoples, including:
Glue: The resin collected from the base of the plant, yellowish to brown, can be heated and used as a glue. The O'odham and Seri use it for hafting, to hold points on arrows and harpoons.
Sealer: A different sort of resin collected from the upper stems is more gummy and generally a clear yellow. The Seri use this to seal pottery vessels.
Incense: Early Spanish friars learned that the resin made a highly fragrant incense, akin to frankincense in odor.
Gum: The Sells area Tohono O'odham children use upper stem resin as a passable chewing gum.
Toothbrush: Oldtime cowboys used brittlebush stem as a fine toothbrush.
Medicinal: Seri use brittlebush to treat toothache; the bark is removed, the branch heated in ashes, and then placed in the mouth to "harden" a loose tooth. The Cahuilla used brittlebush to treat toothaches as well, and used it as a chest pain reliever by heating the gum and applying it to the chest.
Waterproofing: It has been used to waterproof containers.
Varnish: It has been melted then used as a varnish.

References

External links

UC Jepson Manual treatment for Encelia farinosa
Encelia farinosa – U.C. CalPhotos Gallery

farinosa
Flora of the Southwestern United States
Flora of Northwestern Mexico
Flora of the California desert regions
Flora of the Sonoran Deserts
Flora of the Coachella Valley
Natural history of the California chaparral and woodlands
Natural history of the Colorado Desert
Natural history of the Mojave Desert
Natural history of the Peninsular Ranges
Natural history of the Santa Monica Mountains
Plants used in traditional Native American medicine
Drought-tolerant plants
Garden plants of North America
Plants described in 1848
Taxa named by Asa Gray
Taxa named by John Torrey
Flora without expected TNC conservation status